Louis Depière (1872-1962) was a merchant navy officer and a sailor from Belgium, who represented his native country at the 1920 Summer Olympics in Ostend, Belgium. Depière took the 4th place in the 6 Metre.

He was also the Worshipful Master (1928-1929) of the mixed Freemasonic lodge “Aurore” in Bruges, before re-opening the “Trois Niveaux” lodge in Ostend (1932).

References

Sources
 
 
 

Belgian male sailors (sport)
Sailors at the 1920 Summer Olympics – 6 Metre
Olympic sailors of Belgium
Place of birth missing
1872 births
1962 deaths